Anthony Richards Manser (1924–1995) was a British philosopher and Professor of Philosophy at Southampton University. He was a president of Aristotelian Society and a member of the Mind Association.

References

1924 births
1995 deaths
21st-century British philosophers
Academics of the University of Southampton